Swipe Me is the debut album by the Danish trance duo Barcode Brothers, released on 11 August 2000. It reached No. 24 on the Danish albums chart.

Track listing

Charts

References

External links
Swipe Me at Discogs

2000 debut albums
Barcode Brothers albums